United States gubernatorial elections were held 31 states, concurrent with the House and Senate elections, on November 8, 1910 (except in Arkansas, Georgia, Maine and Vermont, which held early elections).

In Oregon, the gubernatorial election was held on the same day as federal elections for the first time, having previously been held in June.

Results

See also 
1910 United States elections
1910–11 United States Senate elections
1910 United States House of Representatives elections

References

Bibliography

Notes 

 
November 1910 events